Keerthy Suresh (born 17 October 1992) is an Indian actress, dancer, playback singer, philanthropist and promotional model who appears predominantly in Tamil and Telugu films, in addition to a few Malayalam films. She won the National Film Award for Best Actress for portraying actress Savitri in the Telugu film Mahanati (2018). She has also received three SIIMA Awards, one Filmfare Award South, and one Zee Cine Awards Telugu among others for her performance in various films. She was recognised as Forbes 3 under 30 in 2021.

Keerthy is the daughter of film producer G. Suresh Kumar and actress Menaka G. Suresh.

She began her career as a child actress in the early 2000s and returned to films after studying fashion design. She had her first lead role in the 2013 Malayalam film Geethaanjali. She went on to star in successful films such as Ring Master (2014), Rajinimurugan (2016), Remo (2016), Bairavaa (2017), Nenu Local (2017), Sandakozhi 2 (2018), Mahanati (2018), Sarkar (2018), Sandakozhi 2 (2018), Penguin (2020), Miss India (2021), Good Luck Sakhi (2022) and Sarkaru Vaari Paata (2022).

Early life 
Keerthy was born on 17 October 1992 in Madras (now Chennai), Tamil Nadu, India. Her father G. Suresh Kumar is a filmmaker of Malayali descent, while her mother Menaka is an actress of Tamil origin. She has an elder sister Revathy Suresh. Until class four, Keerthy did her schooling in Chennai, Tamil Nadu. She then studied in Kendriya Vidyalaya, Pattom, Thiruvananthapuram before coming back to Chennai to join the Pearl Academy, where she completed her degree in fashion design. She also spent time on an exchange program in Scotland for four months, before completing a two-month internship in London. Despite making a career in acting, she has stated that she was also "seriously considering a career in designing". Keerthy also knows to play the violin.

Career

Early work (2000–2017) 
In the early 2000s, Keerthy worked as a child actress in a few of her father's productions, such as Pilots (2000), Achaneyanenikkishtam (2001) and Kuberan (2002) and some television serials.

11 years after Kuberan, she made her debut as a lead actress in Priyadarshan's horror film Geethaanjali, in which she had a dual role. She was still studying during that time and shot for Geethanjali during her semester break. Reviews on the film and her performance were mixed, with Sify writing that she "does put in some effort but makes only a limited impression in a double role", while Rediff wrote that she "has got a plum role but whether she impresses with her acting prowess is another matter". In 2014, Keerthy had her next release Ring Master, directed by Rafi of Rafi Mecartin duo, in which she shared screen space with Dileep. She played a blind girl, which she said was much more challenging than her double role in Geethanjali. The film was a commercial success, being termed a "super hit" by Sify.

In 2015, Keerthy accepted her first projects outside of Malayalam and signed on to appear in several Tamil film projects simultaneously. Her first film release was A. L. Vijay's romantic comedy Idhu Enna Maayam (2015), opposite Vikram Prabhu, though the film did not perform well at the box office. Her busy schedule throughout 2015 meant that she had to opt out of films which she had already started working on, including Krishna's Maane Thaene Paeye and Deekay's Kavalai Vendam, in order to accommodate bigger projects. She consequently worked on two films with Sivakarthikeyan in quick succession, Rajinimurugan and Remo, while also playing the lead role in Prabhu Solomon's Thodari, alongside Dhanush.

Her Telugu debut was planned to be Ainaa Ishtam Nuvvu. However, the film is delayed since 2015, with reports of release after September 2020 under a new title Janakitho Nenu. Subsequently, the debut was the 2016 film Nenu Sailaja with actor Ram Pothineni. In January 2017, Keerthy appeared in Bairavaa, opposite actor Vijay and directed by Bharathan. She also appeared in Tamil film Paambhu Sattai and Telugu film Nenu Local in 2017.

Mahanati and beyond (2018–present) 

Her first release in 2018, was Agnyaathavaasi in Telugu. Her first Tamil film in 2018 was  Thaanaa Serndha Koottam, in which she played opposite Suriya, for the very first time. The film opened to positive reviews and became a hit. She also acted in the Nag Ashwin-directed biographical drama Mahanati where she portrayed the late southern actress Savitri and for which her performance has received critical acclaim and the National Film Award for Best Actress. Her performance in the film featured in the list of "100 Greatest Performances of the Decade" by Film Companion.

In late 2018, she appeared in three consecutive commercial films, Saamy Square opposite Vikram directed by Hari, Sandakozhi 2 opposite Vishal directed by N. Lingusamy and Sarkar opposite Vijay, directed by AR Murugadoss. In mid-2019, she made a cameo appearance in the Nagarjuna starrer Manmadhudu 2, which was directed by Rahul Ravindran. In 2020, she appeared in the thriller film Penguin, which released on Amazon Prime due to the COVID-19 pandemic and in the drama film Miss India which released on Netflix.

In 2021, Keerthy starred in the Telugu language film Rang De opposite Nithiin. Keerthy's next film Annaatthe starring Rajinikanth directed by Siva opened to negative reviews but was a commercial success. Her next release was the Malayalam film Marakkar: Arabikadalinte Simham starring Mohanlal directed by  Priyadarshan, which opened to mixed reviews became box office bomb.

Her first release of 2022 was the Telugu film Good Luck Sakhi which again opened to negative reviews and ended up as a commercial failure. Keerthy went on to appear alongside director Selvaraghavan in Saani Kaayidham, which marks the latter's acting debut. Her role went on to be critically acclaimed and is one of her best roles done by her. The film had a direct OTT release in Amazon Prime Video. Her next film was the Parasuram directorial Sarkaru Vaari Paata, alongside Mahesh Babu which was a commercial success. She was next seen in the Malayalam courtroom drama Vaashi opposite Tovino Thomas.

Her next set of films include the Chiranjeevi-starrer Bholaa Shankar, the Mari Selvaraj directorial Maamannan , the Nani-starrer Dasara and Jayamravi starrer Siren.

Keerthy Suresh has worked extensively in Telugu, Malayalam, and Tamil films. She will now enthrall the nation as a powerful woman in KGF Chapter 2 and Kantara's Pan India release Tamil film Raghuthatha by Hombale Films.   She is now roped into a new woman centric film Revolver Rita which is coming to Netflix as a post-theatrical release.

Filmography

Film

Television

Music video

Awards and nominations

References

External links 

 
 

Living people
Tamil actresses
21st-century Indian actresses
Actresses in Malayalam cinema
Actresses in Tamil cinema
Actresses in Telugu cinema
Kendriya Vidyalaya alumni
Actresses from Chennai
Actresses in Malayalam television
Indian television actresses
21st-century Indian child actresses
Child actresses in Malayalam cinema
South Indian International Movie Awards winners
1992 births
Best Actress National Film Award winners
Filmfare Awards South winners
Zee Cine Awards Telugu winners
Indian film actresses